The Callanish VIII stone setting is one of many megalithic structures around the better-known (and larger) Calanais I on the west coast of the Isle of Lewis, in the Outer Hebrides (Western Isles), Scotland. It is also known locally as Tursachan.

This is a very unusual (and possibly unique) setting, with a semicircle of four large stones on the edge of a cliff on the south of the island of Great Bernera and looking across a narrow strait to Lewis.  There is no evidence that the cliff has collapsed here and destroyed half of a complete circle – it would appear that a semicircle was the original intention.  The tallest stone is nearly three metres high and the cliff-edge axis of the circle gives a diameter of about 20 metres.

Footnotes

External links

 Photos of Callanish VIII on the Ancient Scotland site

Archaeological sites in the Outer Hebrides
Isle of Lewis
Scheduled monuments in Scotland